Crispano is a comune (municipality) in the Metropolitan City of Naples in the Italian region Campania, located about 13 km north of Naples.

Crispano borders the following municipalities: Caivano, Cardito, Frattamaggiore, Frattaminore, Orta di Atella.

References

Cities and towns in Campania